Batman: Dark Tomorrow is an action-adventure game developed and published by Kemco for the GameCube and Xbox in 2003. It is based on the DC Comics character Batman and his iteration from the DC Universe source material. Many precedents of the comics are cited, especially as it pertains to Ra's al Ghul, and Batman's "undefined" relationship with al Ghul's daughter, Talia al Ghul.

Initially announced in 2001 as a GameCube exclusive, Batman: Dark Tomorrow was envisioned as being an open-ended, faithful, and realistic approach to the Batman franchise, in a similar vein to the Batman: Arkham series years later. However, as development progressed, the game was scaled back and slated for release on multiple consoles.

Upon release, the game received overwhelmingly negative reviews from critics, being criticized for its poor controls, camera and technical issues, and is often considered one of the worst video games ever made. A PlayStation 2 version of the game was planned to be released but was cancelled.

Gameplay 
Batman: Dark Tomorrow is a linear, stealth-based action game in which players control Batman as he fights crime. Batman is equipped with several of his tools, such as Batarangs, smoke bombs, and grappling hooks. Levels each have certain objectives that players must achieve in order to proceed, while criminals and enemies will attempt to stop your progress. While enemies can be knocked unconscious, they cannot be killed (due to Batman's "no killing" code); this requires the player to handcuff the criminal in order to keep them from attacking. There are several parts in levels in which the game saves; if the player dies, it will reload to the last save. Members of Batman's supporting cast of allies also appear in the cinematics of the game, including Oracle, Robin, and Batgirl. Nightwing does not appear but is mentioned in dialogue as possible backup leading into the game's climax.

The game features various endings depending on how the last few sections of the game are played. To get the "good" ending, Batman must disarm a signal device before facing Ra's. This is never made clear to the player beforehand, however, and as such the ending most players will get is one of the 3 "bad" endings which consists of Batman defeating Ra's who then sets off the bombs he has set up around the globe, ultimately resulting in his success. This initially caused confusion among gamers and critics as to why "beating" the game essentially had Batman failing to prevent the death of 1/3 of the world's population.

Plot
Ra's al Ghul (Don Leslie), his daughter Talia (Wendy Jones), and his League of Assassins take control of a weaponized satellite that is targeting Gotham City. While trying to end a gang war between The Ventriloquist and Black Mask (Michael Wright), Batman (Julian Fletcher) discovers that Commissioner James Gordon (Ron McLarty) has been kidnapped and is being held hostage at an overrun Arkham Asylum. Racing through Gotham City's sewers to enter the Asylum undetected, Batman has to fight through several foes, including Victor Zsasz (Scott Sowers), Ratcatcher (Jonathan Roumie), Mr. Freeze (Ralph Byers), Poison Ivy (Wendy Jones), and Killer Croc (Richardo Ferrone), before finally encountering the Joker (Allen Enlow), the mastermind behind Gordon's kidnapping. After defeating the Joker and saving Gordon, Batman realizes that the villain was actually working for Ra's al Ghul and the kidnapping scheme was merely a distraction to allow Ra's to commence his newest plan to take over the world.

Traveling to the Himalayas, Batman makes his way to the League of Assassins' stronghold to foil Ra's al Ghul's scheme. Talia helps him by turning off the cameras around Ra's lair. Batman finds a terminal and overrides the homing signal, before defeating Ubu (Dean Wein), Ra's most trusted servant, guarding the entrance to the throne room. There, Batman confronts Ra, who reveals his master plan: 24 bombs have been planted throughout the world, which, once activated, will cause the ice caps to enter the oceans, forming tsunamis and hurricanes throughout the coastlines; every coastal city on the world will be destroyed and one-third of the planet's population with it, allowing Ra's to rebuild the world in his image. Ra then asks Batman to marry Talia and become his heir, but the Dark Knight declines, much to Talia's disappointment. Ra and Batman engage in a final swordfight, with Batman emerging victorious. A defeated Ra attempts to activate the bombs, but to no avail, as they had already been disabled by Batman. Ubu, having recovered, then tries to kill Batman, but Talia warns him and Batman dodges the attack, causing Ubu to unintentionally kill Ra instead. Talia and Ubu take Ra to the Lazarus Pit as the temple begins to self-destruct and revive him, while Batman escapes and returns to Gotham. As he looks out over the city, the Bat-Signal ignites the sky once more, calling him back into action.

Several alternate endings are possible, depending on whether or not the player had found and deactivated Ra's weapon before the final battle with him, or lost the fight. If Batman did not disable the signal and loses the sword fight, he is mortally wounded by Ra and dies in Talia's arms, as Ra puts his plan into action and floods the world. If Batman loses the fight but disabled the signal, Ra reveals to the dying Batman that the override is only temporary and that his victory is inevitable. If Batman wins the fight but did not disable the signal, a defeated Ra still manages to commence his plan and flood the world, as Batman watches on in horror.

Development
Dark Tomorrow was presented at E3 2001 as an exclusive to the GameCube console. It was originally conceived as an open world oriented adaptation of the comic book iteration of Batman. Similar to Activision's Spider-Man 2, players would control Batman as he traveled around Gotham City, with the ability to patrol Gotham in the Batmobile, Batplane, and Batboat. Character A.I. and combat was very ambitious in order to allow an in-depth open world Batman experience. However, the game was later revealed to be in the works for both the Xbox and PlayStation 2 consoles, and was reworked into a more linear and stealth-based game.

Veteran DC Comics and former Batman: Gotham Adventures writer Scott Peterson (who also wrote the previous year's Superman: The Man of Steel video game) and Final Fantasys Kenji Terada created the story for Dark Tomorrow, while the Royal Philharmonic Orchestra performed the game's orchestrated score. Peterson was not aware of Terada's involvement at the time he worked on the game's story, relating years later that he wrote the script alone while working as DC Comics' Batman office liaison and that Terada was likely brought on after he completed the script. The game had a total development span of four years before ultimately being released on the GameCube and Xbox in early 2003. The PlayStation 2 version was eventually cancelled.

Reception

Batman: Dark Tomorrow gained infamy for receiving negative reviews on both platforms according to video game review aggregator Metacritic. Primary criticism of the game was directed at its control scheme, repetitive missions, and its camera, which was described as frustrating. Game Informer gave the GameCube version 0.75 out of 10 for gameplay that is "incomprehensible and littered with bugs". IGN was severely disappointed with the same console version, saying that "The Dark Knight gets his wings clipped in his latest adventure."

Although the gameplay was widely criticized, Peterson and Terada's story, as well as the in-game cinematics, were praised. IGN noted, "Positive marks earned here for sticking to the DC-based Batman license and faithfully bringing it to life. The cut-scenes are arguably the best part of the game." The ending, however, was met with criticism as there is no in-game direction to the "good ending". The game was featured in TripleJump’s ‘Worst Games Ever’ YouTube series.

Notes

References

External links
 

2003 video games
Action-adventure games
Batman video games
Cancelled PlayStation 2 games
Eco-terrorism in fiction
Kemco games
GameCube games
Genocide in fiction
Video games developed in Japan
Video games developed in the United Kingdom
Video games set in psychiatric hospitals
Video games with alternate endings
Xbox games
Superhero video games
Single-player video games
Video games set in Asia
Video games set in castles
Video games set in the United States
HotGen games